Pula may refer to:

Phola language
Tadyawan language 
Blang language